"House of Love" is a song by Christian music singer Amy Grant, recorded as a duet with country singer Vince Gill. It was released in November 1994 as the second single (after "Lucky One") from her House of Love album in the United States and the fourth and final single from the album in the United Kingdom.

Background
Following the massive success of her 1991 hit album Heart In Motion, Amy Grant took some time off from recording and touring. She conceived her third child in early 1992, and Sarah Cannon Chapman was born on October 11. That same month, Grant's second Christmas album, Home For Christmas was released, spawning two major singles: "Breath Of Heaven" and "Grown Up Christmas List."

Grant spent much of 1993 writing songs for her next album, House of Love, but also found time to record Songs from the Loft, a praise and worship album for teenagers that won the 1994 GMA Music Award for "Praise & Worship Album of the Year." House of Love was soon completed thereafter, and the title track, a duet with country singer Vince Gill, was issued as its second single.

Two versions of the song were recorded. One with producer Keith Thomas; another with producer Michael Omartian. Only Thomas' was released on the album though Grant said she initially considered putting them both on the album. A snippet of Omartian's version, with a slightly more hip-hop lilt, can be heard on the documentary "Building the House of Love," a video that documented the making of the album. Omartian's version has never been released (the alternate versions on the maxis were remixes, not alternate recordings). Gill sang on both versions.

The song can also be heard over the closing credits of the Michael Keaton/Geena Davis romantic comedy Speechless.

Chart performance
"House of Love," the second single from the album,  performed moderately well on the charts. Although it didn't reach the Christian radio charts, it was a huge success on the Adult Contemporary chart, peaking at #5. It also cracked the Top Forty of the Billboard Hot 100, where it reached #37, and became a minor hit in the United Kingdom, peaking at #46 in that country.

Notwithstanding its chart success, the remaining legacy of "House of Love" is that the recording sessions for the song are where Grant and Gill first spent meaningful time together, and they soon became fast friends. Throughout the 1990s they remained so.  Later, Grant divorced from her husband Gary Chapman in 1999; Gill had divorced in 1998. Grant and Gill married a year later, and thus established the legacy of "House of Love" as the point where Amy Grant and Vince Gill first began their friendly relationship.

Official versions
Original album version (4:38), available on the House Of Love album
The Classic Philly Soul mix (4:37)
The South Street Remix (4:38)
UK radio mix
Alternate version, available as a bonus video on Greatest Videos 1986-2004

Track listing
U.S. promotional CD single
"House of Love" (LP Version)
"House of Love" (The Classic Philly Soul mix)
"House of Love" (The South Street Remix)

U.S. retail CD single
"House of Love" (The Classic Philly Soul mix)
"House of Love" (The South Street Remix)
"House of Love" (LP Version)
"Lucky One" (Kupper 12" mix)

U.K. CD single
"House of Love" (Radio mix) [by Al Clay]
"Baby Baby" (No Getting Over You mix)
"Good For Me"
"House of Love"

U.K. CD single II
"House of Love" (Radio mix)
"Big Yellow Taxi" (Paradise mix)
"That's What Love Is For"
"Lead Me On"

Personnel 
 Amy Grant – lead vocals 
 Vince Gill – harmony vocals 
 Keith Thomas – electric piano, synthesizers 
 Phil Madeira – Hammond B3 organ
 Kenny Greenberg – acoustic guitar, electric guitar
 Jerry McPherson – electric guitar 
 Tommy Sims – bass 
 Chad Cromwell – drums 
 Terry McMillan – percussion 
 Ada Dyer – backing vocals 
 Judson Spence – backing vocals 
 Audrey Wheeler – backing vocals

Charts

Weekly charts

Year-end charts

References 

Amy Grant songs
Vince Gill songs
1994 singles
Male–female vocal duets
1994 songs
A&M Records singles
Songs written by Greg Barnhill
Song recordings produced by Keith Thomas (record producer)
Songs written by Kenny Greenberg
Songs written by Wally Wilson